Ryan Michael Castellani (born April 1, 1996) is an American professional baseball pitcher for the Kansas City Monarchs of the American Association of Professional Baseball. He previously played in Major League Baseball (MLB) for the Colorado Rockies and Oakland Athletics.

Amateur career
Castellani attended Brophy College Preparatory in Phoenix, Arizona. He was drafted by the Colorado Rockies in the second round of the 2014 Major League Baseball draft and signed.

Professional career

Colorado Rockies
Castellani made his professional debut that year with the Tri-City Dust Devils and spent the whole season there, going 1–2 with a 3.65 ERA in ten starts. Castellani spent 2015 with the Asheville Tourists where he was 2–7 with a 4.45 ERA in 27 starts, and 2016 with the Modesto Nuts where he posted a 7–8 record with a 3.81 ERA in 26 starts. In 2017, he pitched for the Hartford Yard Goats, pitching to a 9–2 record and 4.81 ERA in 27 games started. He spent 2018 with Hartford, going 7–9 with a 5.49 ERA in 26 starts.

The Rockies added Castellani to their 40-man roster after the 2018 season. He also made it 7 starts with the Salt River Rafters of the Arizona Fall League following the 2018 season. He spent 2019 with the Albuquerque Isotopes, pitching to a 2–5 record and an 8.31 ERA over ten starts, striking out 47 over  innings. He returned to the Salt River Rafters following 2019. On June 23, 2020, it was announced that Castellani had tested positive for COVID-19. He returned in time for the start of summer camp on July 4.

Castellani made his major league debut with the Rockies on August 8, 2020, against the Seattle Mariners, retiring the first 12 batters he faced.
 In his rookie year, Castellani logged a 1–4 record and 5.82 ERA in 10 appearances.

Castellani only made one appearance for the Rockies in 2021, giving up 2 runs in  innings, before he was designated for assignment on June 24, 2021. He was outrighted to Triple-A Albuquerque on June 30. He elected free agency on November 7, 2021.

Oakland Athletics
On November 23, 2021, Castellani signed a minor league contract with the Oakland Athletics. He spent time with the Athletics in spring training, and was optioned to minor league camp before the 2022 season began. On April 15, 2022, Castellani was added to the Athletics roster for their road trip to Toronto as a COVID-related substitute. Castellani made 3 scoreless appearances for Oakland, striking out one in 2.2 innings of work. On April 29, he was removed from the 40-man roster and returned to the Triple-A Las Vegas Aviators. He struggled to an 11.97 ERA in 26 games for Las Vegas before he was released on July 28, 2022.

Kansas City Monarchs
On February 13, 2023, Castellani signed with the Kansas City Monarchs of the American Association of Professional Baseball.

World Baseball Classic
Castellani opened two games for Italy in the World Baseball Classic in March 2023, with two earned runs and three strikeouts over four innings.

References

External links

1996 births
Living people
Baseball players from Philadelphia
Major League Baseball pitchers
Colorado Rockies players
Oakland Athletics players
Tri-City Dust Devils players
Asheville Tourists players
Modesto Nuts players
Hartford Yard Goats players
Albuquerque Isotopes players
Salt River Rafters players
2023 World Baseball Classic players